"Smile" is a song based on the theme song used in the soundtrack for Charlie Chaplin's 1936 film Modern Times.

Background
Chaplin, who composed the song, was inspired by Puccini's Tosca. John Turner and Geoffrey Parsons added the lyrics and title in 1954. In the lyrics, based on lines and themes from the film, the singer is telling the listener to cheer up and that there is always a bright tomorrow, just as long as they smile.

"Smile" has become a popular standard since its original use in Chaplin's film and has been recorded by numerous artists.

Cover versions

Nat King Cole version

Nat King Cole recorded the first version with lyrics. It charted in 1954, reaching number 10 on the Billboard charts and number 2 on the UK Singles Chart. This version was also used at the beginning of the 1975 movie Smile.

Sammy Davis Jr. recorded a cover version of the Cole original, as part of his tribute album The Nat King Cole Songbook in 1965.

Charts

Michael Jackson version

Singer Michael Jackson often cited "Smile" as his favourite song and recorded it for his 1995 double album HIStory: Past, Present and Future, Book I. It was scheduled to be released as the seventh and final single from the album in 1997. However, it was cancelled at the last minute and only a few copies, mostly promos, went into circulation in the UK, South Africa and the Netherlands, making it one of the rarest and most collectible of all Jackson's releases. Entertainment Weekly called this version of the song a "destined-for-Disney rendition." In 2009 at Jackson's memorial, his brother Jermaine Jackson sang a version of the song in Michael's honor. This song is performed in the Michael Jackson: One Las Vegas production.

Track listing
CD maxi single
 "Smile" (short version) – 4:10
 "Is It Scary" (radio edit) – 4:11
 "Is It Scary" (Eddie's Love Mix Edit) – 3:50
 "Is It Scary" (Downtempo Groove Mix) – 4:50
 "Is It Scary" (Deep Dish Dark and Scary Radio Edit) – 4:34

12" maxi single
 A1. "Smile" – 4:55
 A2. "Is It Scary" (Deep Dish Dark and Scary Remix) – 12:07
 B1. "Is It Scary" (Eddie's Rub-a-Dub Mix) – 5:00
 B2. "Is It Scary" (Eddie's Love Mix) – 8:00
 B3. "Off the Wall" (Junior Vasquez Remix) – 4:57

Promotional single
 "Smile" (short version) – 4:10

Promotional CD single
 "Smile" (short version) – 4:10
 "Is It Scary" (radio edit) – 4:11

Charts

Other charting versions
September 1954: Sunny Gale (with Hugo Winterhalter Orchestra) - RCA Victor 5836 (#19)
October 1954: David Whitfield - Decca F.10355 (#25)
In 1959, Tony Bennett recorded the song which in the US, peaked at #73 on the Hot 100.
In late 1964, Jerry Butler & Betty Everett recorded and charted with the song as a duet.

Other notable recordings
 Judy Garland sang a version of Nat King Cole's song on The Ed Sullivan Show in 1963.
 The song was also recorded by Jimmy Durante as part of his album Jackie Barnett Presents Hello Young Lovers in 1965.
 Eric Clapton's performance of the song in 1972 at the Hammersmith Odeon was included on the 2004 version of his album 461 Ocean Boulevard.
 The song was included in the soundtrack of Chaplin's 1992 biographical film, as covered by its lead actor Robert Downey Jr.
 Barbra Streisand recorded her own version for [[The Movie Album (Barbra Streisand album)|The Movie Album]] in 2003.
 Steven Tyler sang that song on Chris Botti's 2005 album To Love Again: The Duets. 
 In 2006, Tony Bennett did his own version of the song in his album Duets: An American Classic with singer Barbra Streisand.
 Janelle Monáe recorded a version for the 2008 special edition of her EP Metropolis: The Chase Suite.
 Lady Gaga performed the song for One World: Together at Home in April of 2020 amid the COVID-19 pandemic.
 Luke Evans sang his version of this song for BBC Children in Need: We Got it Covered  in 2019.

Popular culture
The Jimmy Durante recording is part of the soundtrack to the 2019 film Joker, starring Joaquin Phoenix and Robert De Niro. The lead character also watched scenes from Modern Times, the film from which the instrumental track that would become "Smile" originated, during a scene in which he sneaks into a movie theatre.
The song was used in the Season 4 episode of The Middle titled "The Smile."A version of "Smile" was used in a public information film from the British Union for the Abolition of Vivisection in 1989, before another version of the PIF was shot using The Thinner The Air by Cocteau Twins.
A recording by Frank Chacksfield and his orchestra was used over the closing titles of the last episode of the original run of "Jeopardy!" on Jan. 3, 1975.
"Smile" was also used as the opening for Jerry Lewis' live Labor Day MDA telethon.
Sung by Scarlett Estevez in the 10th episode of the 5th season of Lucifer.
"Smile" was in the 1994 film My Girl 2.
The American musical comedy-drama television series Glee featured "Smile" in "Mattress", the 12th episode of the first season. In the episode the song is performed by the New Directions and features solos from Lea Michele, Cory Monteith, Amber Riley, and Kevin McHale.
The title of The Pillows album Smile'' is a reference to "Smile".

References

External links
 Lyrics to "Smile" on CharlieChaplin.com (accessed 4/21/2018)

1936 songs
Compositions by Charlie Chaplin
Nat King Cole songs
Michael Jackson songs
La India songs
British pop songs
Jazz compositions in D minor
Songs with lyrics by Geoffrey Parsons (lyricist)
Songs with lyrics by John Turner (lyricist)
Song recordings produced by Michael Jackson
Music published by Bourne Co. Music Publishers
Epic Records singles
Pop standards